François Hauter (born 1951) is a French senior reporter, a former chief editor for Le Figaro and correspondent in Africa, China and the United-States. He won the Albert Londres Prize in 1986 and the Louis Hachette prize in 2008.

He was born in France, in Alsace where he spent his childhood. Very early, he went to America. He was a war reporter in Lebanon, Chad, Cambodia and Afghanistan. He has been a member of the Albert London Prize jury since 1988 and is now a writer.

Works 
2002: 
2008: 
2010: 
2012:

External links 
 Les amours chinoises de François Hauter on L'Express
 François Hauter, Planète chinoise  on Carnets Nord
 Articles by François Hauser on Le Figaro
 Massivement surveillées, nos sociétés sont entrées dans l’ère post-démocratique on Le Temps
 Haiti's Repressive Regime on Worldpress.org (February 2004)

1951 births
Living people
Writers from Mulhouse
21st-century French writers
20th-century French journalists
French war correspondents
Albert Londres Prize recipients